Events from the year 1952 in Taiwan, Republic of China. This year is numbered Minguo 41 according to the official Republic of China calendar.

Incumbents
 President – Chiang Kai-shek
 Vice President – Li Zongren
 Premier – Chen Cheng
 Vice Premier – Chang Li-sheng

Events

April
 28 April – The signing of Sino-Japanese Peace Treaty in Taipei between Japan and the Republic of China.

August
 5 August 5 The Sino-Japanese Peace Treaty went into effect to officially end the Second Sino-Japanese War.

Births
 1 January
 Chen Hsueh-sheng, Magistrate of Lienchiang County (2001–2009).
 Wang Ching-feng, Minister of Justice (2008–2010).
 13 February – Lung Ying-tai, Minister of Culture (2012–2014).
 28 January – Lin Zi-miao, Magistrate of Yilan County.
 1 April – Kuo Fang-yu, Minister of Labor (2016–2017).
 5 April – Li Ang, writer.
 8 April – Chen Shyh-kwei, Minister of Overseas Community Affairs Council (2013–2016).
 2 June – Yiin Chii-ming, Minister of the Council for Economic Planning and Development (2012–2013).
 20 July – Shih Su-mei, Minister of the Directorate-General of Budget, Accounting and Statistics (2008–2016).
 2 August – Lee Shying-jow, Minister of the Veterans Affairs Council (2016-2018).
 8 August – Walis Perin, Minister of Council of Indigenous Peoples (2005–2007).
 13 August – Lee Si-chen, engineer and researcher.
 21 September – Tung Hsiang-lung, Minister of the Veterans Affairs Council (2013–2016).
 10 October – Hwang Jung-chiou, Chairman of Taiwan Power Company (2012–2016).
 27 October – Sheu Yu-jer, Minister of Finance (2016-2018).
 28 October – Shih Chih-ming, Mayor of Tainan City (1989–1997).
 6 November – Tsai Ling-yi, Second Lady of the Republic of China (2012–2016).
 14 November – Yen Teh-fa, Minister of National Defense.
 8 December – Wang Chung-yi, Minister of Coast Guard Administration (2014–2016).
 14 December – Lee Chung-wei, Deputy Chairperson of Ocean Affairs Council.

References

 
Years of the 20th century in Taiwan